The Church of St Catherine in Drayton, Somerset, England dates from the 15th century. It has been designated as a Grade I listed building.

St Catherine's exterior is blue lias and golden hamstone. It was restored in 1855 by Maurice Davis of Langport and again in 1896.

The 15th-century cross in the churchyard has a sculpture of St Michael with a sword and shield in the act of vanquishing a dragon.

In 2002 plans to put a new floor in the tower provoked objections from parishioners and was eventually resolved by the Ecclesiastical Court.

The rectory, known as Drayton Court, which dates from the early 19th century, is now a private house.

The parish is part of the benefice covered by the Langport Area Team Ministry within the deanery of Ivelchester.

Stained glass windows

See also

 Grade I listed buildings in South Somerset
 List of Somerset towers
 List of ecclesiastical parishes in the Diocese of Bath and Wells

References

15th-century church buildings in England
Church of England church buildings in South Somerset
Grade I listed churches in Somerset
Grade I listed buildings in South Somerset